Chaz Robinson may refer to:
 Chaz Robinson (American football)
 Chaz Robinson (singer)

See also
 Charles Robinson (disambiguation)